Folketing elections were held alongside Landsting elections in Denmark on 21 April 1953, except in the Faroe Islands where they were held on 7 May. The Social Democratic Party remained the largest in the Folketing, with 61 of the 151 seats. Voter turnout was 81% in Denmark proper but just 20% in the Faroes.

They were the last elections under the bicameral system, as the Landsting was abolished later in the year.

Results

References

Elections in Denmark
Denmark
1953 elections in Denmark
April 1953 events in Europe